Artemisia douglasiana, known as California mugwort, Douglas's sagewort, or dream plant, is a western North American species of aromatic herb in the sunflower family.

Distribution and habitat
The herbaceous perennial is native to the Western United States in California and areas of Idaho, Nevada, Oregon, and Washington; and in northwestern Baja California, Mexico.

The plant prefers direct sunlight and moist soils, but tolerates shady areas and dry soils. It occupies hardiness zones 6a to 10b and occurs at elevations ranging from 0–3080 meters. A. douglasiana is often found in ditches and streambanks.

Description
Artemisia douglasiana is dicot, and a perennial forb. Its stems grow from a substantial colony of rhizomes which require a minimum soil depth of 16 cm and can grow in fine to coarse soils.

Its grey-green leaves are evenly spaced, elliptical, and lobed at the tips. The appearance of the 3–5 lobes at the tips of its leaves may range from being seemingly absent to being highly defined. Its leaves have been shown to contain thujone and cineole.

During its bloom period, which ranges from May to October, the plant features bell-shaped clusters of flowers containing 5–9 pistillate flowers and 6–25 disk flowers.

Although A. douglasiana can reproduce from seed, it is primarily propagated from division and spreading of its underground rhizomes. The extensive rhizomes help prevent erosion by stabilizing streambanks.  A. douglasiana is susceptible to infection by Xylella fastidiosa which causes Pierce's disease.

Uses
Its seeds are foraged by a variety of native birds and its leaves are used as nesting material by some native bees.

Artemisia douglasiana is used by Native American tribes as a medicinal plant to relieve joint pain and headaches, and to treat abrasions and rashes (including poison ivy). It is also used to treat women's reproductive issues, including irregular menstruation and is occasionally used as an abortifacient.

This plant also has ceremonial and spiritual purposes for many tribes.  It is commonly carried to ward off spirits of the dead and was smoked or drunk as a tea to induce vivid dreams.

It is also planted by contemporary herbalists for both medicinal and spiritual uses.

Cultivation
Artemisia douglasiana is cultivated as an ornamental plant by specialty native plant nurseries, for planting in wildlife gardens, natural landscaping design, and habitat restoration and erosion control projects.

References

External links
Jepson Manual Treatment — 'Artemisia douglasiana''
University  of Michigan-Dearborn: Ethnobotany of California mugwort
Lady Bird Johnson Wildflower Center, University of Texas
Oregon Flora Image Project

douglasiana
Flora of the Northwestern United States
Flora of Baja California
Flora of California
Flora of Nevada
Flora of the Cascade Range
Flora of the Great Basin
Flora of the Sierra Nevada (United States)
Natural history of the California chaparral and woodlands
Natural history of the California Coast Ranges
Natural history of the Santa Monica Mountains
Natural history of the Central Valley (California)
Natural history of the Peninsular Ranges
Natural history of the Transverse Ranges
Medicinal plants
Plants used in traditional Native American medicine
Plants described in 1833
Garden plants of North America
Taxa named by Wilibald Swibert Joseph Gottlieb von Besser